Mashak-e Tehranchi (also Romanized as Māshak-e Tehrānchī; also known as Māshak) is a village in Kurka Rural District, in the Central District of Astaneh-ye Ashrafiyeh County, Gilan Province, Iran. At the 2006 census, its population was 1,018, in 296 families.

References 

Populated places in Astaneh-ye Ashrafiyeh County